Platanthera tipuloides, the Aleutian Bog Orchid or Bering Bog Orchid, is a terrestrial orchid native to the United States, Russia, China, Japan and Korea.

Description

Platanthera tipuloides plants are 20–40 cm tall. There are one or two lance-shaped leaves at the base. There are up to 20 yellow flowers arranged in a spike. Flowering time is from May to July.

Distribution and habitat

Platanthera tipuloides is mainly found in northern Asia. In North America it only occurs on the Aleutian Islands.

Plants grow at an elevation from 700 to 1700 m. They prefer forested slopes, or forest margins along valleys.

Taxonomy
Platanthera tipuloides was first described by Carl Linnaeus the Younger in 1781 as Orchis tipuloides.

References

tipuloides
Orchids of the United States